Aiphanes ulei is a species of flowering plant in the family Arecaceae. It is found in Brazil, Ecuador, and Peru.

References

ulei
Flora of Brazil
Flora of Ecuador
Flora of Peru
Least concern plants
Taxonomy articles created by Polbot
Taxa named by Carl Lebrecht Udo Dammer
Taxa named by Max Burret